MAYAir is a regional airline based in Cancún, Mexico. Its main base is Cancún International Airport.

History
Founded in 1994, MAYAir originally operated charter flights. By February 2009, the airline became a regional feeder on the Cancun-Cozumel route with 6 daily round trips on 19-passenger Dornier 228 aircraft.

Destinations
MAYAir operates the following services:

Mexico
Cancún – Cancún International Airport
Cozumel – Cozumel International Airport
Mérida – Mérida International Airport
Veracruz – Veracruz International Airport
Villahermosa – Villahermosa International Airport

Fleet
The MAYAir fleet includes the following aircraft:

References

External links

Airlines established in 1994
Airlines of Mexico
Transportation in Quintana Roo
1994 establishments in Mexico